Dawn Marie Best-Eshleman is an American artist, game designer and author, known for her work in the Archie Comics version of Sonic the Hedgehog. She is currently a freelance artist, author, and software developer.

Comic work
After being hired at the age of 19, Best became one of Archie's youngest creators. Her first issue of Sonic was issue #101. She has appeared as both guest and attendee of conventions. In addition, she holds annual charity auctions of original artwork. 

She has contributed to several other graphic novels, both as an artist and a writer; including web serials Sylvanna and Heißdampfreaktor. In 2010, she began writing her first graphic novel series, VARULV. The latter became the premier comic book released by her own Gloryhound Network, in February 2011. 

In 2012, she created a limited printed-edition of her serial Daemonology under the name Gloryhound. In 2013, Sylvanna was also added to the roster after a joint-effort between her and Sonic writer, Ian Flynn. It was successfully funded via Kickstarter in one night, eventually reaching double its original goal.

Best cited Patrick Spaziante, one of her peers who highly influenced her work, especially while she was working for Archie Comics. Other influencing figures include Joe Madureira, J. Scott Campbell, and Mike Deodato.

Game Development
As of 2015, Best has served as Creative Director for EVOLV Games and has produced two titles for the company. She was responsible for the artwork as well as server-side programming on Age of the Four Clans, a small-scale online role-playing game released in 2016. Another title, Harmonic Odyssey: The Five Gods is in development with a projected release date of Q4 2021. A demo of Harmonic was released in Q4 2019, and Best was responsible for artwork, musical score, writing, and programming duties on the title.

Activism
Best's family with ties to the United States Armed Forces; her father, brother, grandparents and uncle have all served in various branches. Consequently, in 2002, Best held her first auction of original art in support of the Fisher House, to which she still contributes till date. In recent years, she has been outspoken about the high cost of a college education versus its necessity for young artists, and has marketed the Gloryhound brand around this mantra.  An ordained minister, Best's personal causes often revolve around supporting LGBT marriage equality and suicide prevention, especially among LGBT youths. Many of her original art auctions also support these efforts.

Personal life
Best resides in rural Pennsylvania and is married to a musician, Matthew Eshleman. The couple have one daughter.

References

External links

 Dawn Best's Artstation Page
 Harmonic Odyssey: The Five Gods
 Age of the Four Clans
 Sylvanna.net
 Dawn Best's deviantART Page

American female comics artists
Living people
Year of birth missing (living people)